John Bell Condliffe  (Footscray, Victoria, 23 December 1891 – Walnut Creek, California, 23 December 1981) was a New Zealand economist, university professor and economic consultant. Lauded for the decisive role he played in international NGOs in the interwar period, he was one of New Zealand's best-known international economists.

Career
A professor of economics at the Canterbury University College, Condliffe resigned in 1926 to become the first research secretary of the Institute of Pacific Relations, a nascent international organization concerned with the Pacific basin. He took a 2/3 part-time position at the University of Michigan during the academic year 1930–1931, then left the IPR altogether to enter the League of Nations Secretariat, where he wrote the six first World Economic Surveys (1932-1937).

Having left the League to become professor of commerce at the London School of Economics in 1938–1939, Condliffe was distinguished in 1939 by the prestigious Howland Memorial Prize and accepted a professorship in economics at the University of California, Berkeley, which he held until retirement in 1953. In the meantime, he returned to the IPR as the chairman of its International Research Committee between 1940 and 1945.

Honours
 1939: Howland Memorial Prize
 1977: KCMG (honorary)

References

Books
 John B. Condliffe (ed. and preface William L. Holland), Reminiscences of the Institute of Pacific Relations, Vancouver, Institute of Asian Research (University of British Columbia), 1981.

External References
 Guide to the J.B. Condliffe Papers, ca. 1910-1960, The Bancroft Library
 Finding Aid to the J. B. (John Bell) Condliffe Papers: Additions, 1919-1981 (bulk 1960-1969) at The Bancroft Library
 Register of the John B. Condliffe Papers at the Online Archive of California

1891 births
1981 deaths
Academic staff of the University of Canterbury
Australian emigrants to New Zealand
University of Michigan people
University of California, Berkeley faculty
New Zealand emigrants to the United States